Harunoyama Tatsunao (born 2 August 1976), known as Tatsunao Haruyama is a former Japanese sumo wrestler from Toyota, Aichi. He made his professional debut in March 1992 and reached the top division in March 2004. His highest rank was maegashira 10. Upon retirement from active competition he became an elder in the Japan Sumo Association, under the name Takenawa. He left the Sumo Association in January 2008.

Career record

See also
Glossary of sumo terms
List of past sumo wrestlers

References

1976 births
Living people
Japanese sumo wrestlers
Sumo people from Aichi Prefecture
People from Toyota, Aichi